Kampong Thom, also Krong Kampong Thom, is the capital city of Kampong Thom Province, Cambodia lying on the bank of the Steung Saen River. It is a mid-way stopover on the National Highway No 6 halfway between Phnom Penh and Siem Reap.

The Kampong Thom High School is North of the river bridge, and the Kampong Thom Market is on the south side of the bridge, followed by the main street and dual carriageway. Further south along the road is Steung Saen also a district in Kampong Thom Province and a side road to the Floating Pagoda (វត្ត ក្ដីអណ្ដែត).

One of Kampong Thom's landmarks is a roundabout with a statue of an elephant fighting two tigers.

References

External links

Provincial capitals in Cambodia
Cities in Cambodia
Populated places in Kampong Thom province